Peng Tien-fu (born 1 July 1951) is a Taiwanese politician. He is of Hakka descent.

Career 
Peng was elected to the Taoyuan County Council in 1986 and served until 1990, when he became a member of the Taiwan Provincial Consultative Council. There, Peng served two terms, to 1998. In 2001, he was elected to the Legislative Yuan. Upon losing his second reelection campaign in 2008, Peng was appointed deputy minister of the Hakka Affairs Council. In 2010, he declared his candidacy for a Taoyuan County by-election, but later dropped out, supporting eventual winner .

References

1951 births
Living people
Taoyuan City Members of the Legislative Yuan
Democratic Progressive Party Members of the Legislative Yuan
Members of the 5th Legislative Yuan
Members of the 6th Legislative Yuan
Taiwanese politicians of Hakka descent
Taoyuan City Councilors
20th-century Taiwanese politicians